Acianthera myrticola is a species of orchid endemic to Brazil (Minas Gerais).

References

myrticola
Orchids of Minas Gerais